is a national park in Niigata Prefecture and Nagano Prefecture, Japan.

Prominent mountains of the park include Mount Hiuchi (2,462m), Mount Myōkō (2,454m), Niigata-Yake-Yama (2,400m,), Mount Takatsuma (2,353m), Mount Kurohime (2,054m), Mount Iizuna (1,917m), and Mount Togakushi (1,904m). Other features include  Lake Nojiri and Lake Reisenji. .

See also
 List of national parks of Japan
 Chūbu region
 Togakushi Shrine
 Five Mountains of Northern Nagano Prefecture

References

Gallery

External links
  Map of Myōkō-Togakushi Renzan National Park (North)
  Map of Myōkō-Togakushi Renzan National Park (South)

National parks of Japan
Parks and gardens in Niigata Prefecture
Parks and gardens in Nagano Prefecture
Protected areas established in 2015
2015 establishments in Japan